The suffix -ess (plural -esses) appended to English words makes a female form of the word.

ESS or ess may refer to:

Education 
 Ernestown Secondary School, in Odessa, Ontario
 European Standard School, in Dhaka, Bangladesh

Government
 Economic System of Socialism, an East German economic policy
 Emergency Social Services, in British Columbia, Canada

People 
 Barbara Ess (1948-2021), American photographer
 Brandon Ess (born 1971), German cricketer
 Émile Ess (1932–1990), Swiss rower
 Gene Ess, Japanese-American guitarist

Science and medicine
 Earth system science
 Empty sella syndrome
 Epworth Sleepiness Scale
 European Social Survey
 European Spallation Source, a nuclear research facility
 Euthyroid sick syndrome
 Evolutionarily stable strategy
 Explained sum of squares
 Effective sample size

Sport 
 ES Sétif, an Algerian professional football club
 Étoile Sportive du Sahel, a Tunisian football club
 Extreme Sailing Series, a series of sailing regattas

Technology
 Electronic switching system, an automated telephone exchange
 Emergency stop signal, on automobiles
 Energy storage system
 Environmental Sensor Station
 Environmental stress screening
 ESS Technology, an American multimedia technology manufacturer
 Experimental SAGE Subsector, a prototype Cold War Air Defense Sector

Computing
 Emacs Speaks Statistics
 Emotion-sensitive software
 Extended Service Set, a wireless networking unit
 IBM Enterprise Storage Server

Other uses
 S, the letter
 Central Siberian Yupik language
 Essex, England
 Essen/Mülheim Airport in Germany
 Employee self-service
 Eurest Support Services, a British food services company